Pernik Province is a province in western Bulgaria, neighbouring Serbia. Its main city is Pernik, and other municipalities are Breznik, Kovachevtsi, Radomir, Tran, and Zemen.

Demographics

The following table represents the change of the population in the province after World War II:

Ethnic groups

Total population (2011 census): 133 530

Ethnic groups (2011 census):
Identified themselves: 125 422 persons:
Bulgarians:  120 929 (96,42%)
Romani: 3 560 (2,84%)
Others and indefinable: 933 (0,74%)

Ethnic groups in the province according to 2001 census:
Bulgarians: 145 642,
Romani: 3 035
Others and indefinable: 1155.

Religion
Religious adherence in the province according to 2001 census:

Economy

Industry is of vital importance for the economy of the province. Pernik is the major manufacturing centre, one of the largest in the country with the "Stomana" steel complex; heavy machinery (mining and industrial equipment); building materials and textiles being the most important. There is an enormous plant for heavy machinery in Radomir which produces excavators and industrial equipment, but is currently not working at full capacity.

See also
Provinces of Bulgaria
List of villages in Pernik Province

References

External links
City homepage 
Pernik city information portal 
Information site for Pernik 

 
Provinces of Bulgaria